The American College of Allergy, Asthma and Immunology (ACAAI) is an American professional association of immunologists, asthma specialists and allergists. The organization is headquartered in Arlington Heights, Illinois, United States of America.

Background
The academy was founded in 1942, as The American College of Allergists and was incorporated as a legal entity in the same year. The founders were passionate about establishing the field of Allergy and Immunology as a distinct medical specialty. In 1974, The American Board of Allergy and Immunology (ABAI) was established, further delineating the specialty.

See also
 American Medical Association

References

External links
 Official website

1942 establishments in Illinois
Arlington Heights, Illinois
Medical associations based in the United States
Medical and health organizations based in Illinois
Organizations established in 1942
Immunology organizations